Hornindal Idrettslag is a Norwegian sports club from Hornindal. It has sections for association football, volleyball, Nordic skiing, biathlon and weightlifting.

Notable club members include ski jumper Anders Fannemel. Also, international footballer and later top-level coach Frode Grodås started his career here.

References

Football clubs in Norway
Sport in Sogn og Fjordane
Association football clubs established in 1910
Athletics clubs in Norway
Ski jumping clubs in Norway
1910 establishments in Norway